The United States Army Medical Command, Vietnam (USAMEDCOMV) provided Echelon/Role 3 Health Service Support to units of the United States Army Vietnam (USARV). It was a Table of Distribution and Allowances organization created by consolidating the staffs of the 44th Medical Brigade and the USARV Surgeon's Office. This action was taken as part of the overall drawdown of forces in Vietnam in an effort to reduce headquarters staffs and increase efficiencies. As the medical footprint further reduced in 1972, it was replaced by the United States Army Health Services Group, Vietnam on 30 April 1972.

Lineage

Organized in the Regular Army as Headquarters and Headquarters Company, United States Army Medical Command, Vietnam (Provisional) on 1 March 1970 in South Vietnam
Constituted 14 December 1970 in the Regular Army as Headquarters and Headquarters Company, United States Army Medical Command, Vietnam and activated in South Vietnam
Inactivated 30 April 1972 in South Vietnam

Honors

Campaign participation credit

Vietnam Winter–Spring 1970
Sanctuary Counteroffensive
Vietnam Counteroffensive Phase VII
Consolidation I
Consolidation II
Vietnam Cease-fire

Decorations

Meritorious Unit Commendation (Army), Streamer Embroidered VIETNAM 1970—1971
Republic of Vietnam Civil Action Honor Medal, First Class, Streamer embroidered VIETNAM 1970

History

On 1 March 1970, the United States Army Medical Command, Vietnam was organized as a result of consolidating the 44th Medical Brigade and the USARV Surgeon's Office. The Medical Command organization
eliminated duplication of effort, reduced manpower requirements by 17% end provided a headquarters that would be more responsive to drawdown requirements.

The 43d Medical Group, with headquarters at Nah Trang, was inactivated on 7 February 1970. Per previously developed plans, the reduction of the 44th Medical Brigade from three medical groups to two was the trigger event for the stand-up of the USAMEDCOMV. The 43d Medical Group was responsible for Army level medical support in the area or operations of Military Region II (formerly II Corps Tactical Zone). With the inactivation of the 43d Medical Group the responsibility for the medical units within the geographic area of MR II was divided roughly in half. The 67th Medical Group assumed the responsibility for the northern half and the 68th Medical Group assumed the responsibility for the southern half.

The concept of a medical battalion composed entirely of helicopter and ground ambulance units was also developed. This battalion would have sole responsibility for combat evacuation, both air and air and ground within the 67th Medical Group area of operation. To implement this concept, the 61st Medical Battalion was organized at Qui Nhon during January 1970 and assigned a mix of an air ambulance company, air ambulance detachments, ground ambulance companies and ground ambulance detachments. After a three-month period of testing and observation of the 61st Medical Battalion, the 58th Medical Battalion was organized at Long Binh along similar lines to support the 68th Medical Group.

The concept provided a better utilization of evacuation assets, improved response, improved maintenance and increased command and control. Direct command, control and supervision was provided by a senior experienced Medical Service Corps aviator with extensive experience in medical evacuation, both ground and air.

Calendar year 1970 could be divided into three distinct periods coinciding with the Keystone Robin redeployment schedules. During the first period, Keystone Bluejay, in February through April, the following units were redeployed or inactivated:

The following units were contained in a force structure change with spaces reduced and redistributed within the command:

Although this chart reflects the effective dates, some of these reductions had actually been made months before their effective dates.

During the second redeployment period of calendar year 1970, Keystone Robin (ALPHA), covering June 1970 through 15 October 1970, the following units were redeployed or inactivated:

The following units were contained in a force structure change with spaces reduced and redistributed within the command:

 The 551st Transportation Detachment provided Direct Support Aircraft Maintenance to the 45th Medical Company (Air Ambulance)

During the third period of calendar year 1970, Keystone Robin (BRAVO), covering 15 October through 31 December 1970, the following units were redeployed or inactivated:

On 3 December 1970, the 44th Medical Brigade's colors were returned to Fort Meade Maryland, where the 18th Medical Brigade was reflagged as the 44th.

In addition to the units effected by Key stone activities, other units were relocated in country in order to balance the alignment of medical support in Vietnam:

-* Less personnel and equipment
-** Less equipment
-*** Zero strength personnel and equipment

USAMEDCOMV Mission
To advise the Deputy Commanding General, USARV, on all matters pertaining to the health of the command; exercise technical supervision over all medical activities; control the assignment and utilization of AMEDD officer personnel; and plan for and ensure that adequate medical service is available within USARV.

Command all Army Medical Department units assigned or attached and provide medical, dental and veterinary service support to United States Army personnel, Free World Military Assistance Forces personnel and other categories of personnel as directed. To provide hospitalization, medical and surgical care to Vietnamese civilians injured as a result or hostile action.

USAMEDCOMV Functions 
The USAMEDCOMV was tasked with an extensive list of functions, due to the combination of the staff and command and control missions within the headquarters. Those functions included:

Providing advice to the Deputy Commanding General, USARV, on all matters pertaining to the health of the command and exercising staff responsibility for the health services of the command.
Developing medical policy consistent with the policy of the command, implementing procedures to insure adherence to established policies and issuing policy guidance.
Developing, refining, adjusting, coordinating and implementing medical plans consistent with USARV plans, and developing the medical portion of USARV plans.
Establishing procedures for collection, clearing and evacuation of casualties.
Controlling and directing all medical service operations to include hospitalization, evacuation, dental, veterinary, medical supply and maintenance, preventive medicine and laboratory support activities of the command.
Supervising the medical equipment status reporting system.
Providing veterinary food inspection and animal veterinary service to United States Army Forces and such other United States Forces as directed by higher headquarters.
Coordinating medical research and providing medical laboratory support to United States Army Forces and other United States Forces, as directed.
Providing medical regulating to patients intra-Army, or as directed by higher headquarters.
Directing utilization and assignment of AMEDD officer personnel and monitoring assignment and utilization of enlisted personnel of the command.
Maintaining medical liaison with and coordinating medical, professional and technical matters with the surgeons of higher headquarters.
Providing personnel and administrative support to units assigned or attached.
Providing medical support to United States Army units not having an assigned or organic medical support capability.
Providing dental service to United States Forces on an area basis as required.
Providing humanitarian type dental treatment for United States nationals, Republic of Vietnam Armed Forces and Free World Military Assistance Forces and such other activities and organizations as directed by higher headquarters.
Pursuing an aggressive preventive dentistry program.
On order, be prepared to augment division and separate brigade medical service.
Providing a medical system of hospitalization and evacuation to support United States and Free World Military Assistance Forces and such other activities and organizations as directed by higher headquarters.
Supervising professional medical service of subordinate units.
Exercising custody of medical records and rendering reports on patients treated as required; collecting, analyzing, consolidating and forwarding medical reports and statistics.
Providing technical inspection and maintenance support of medical equipment and supplies.
Providing inventory control, receipt, storage and issue of all medical stocks for United States Army Forces, other US Military Forces and agencies and for designated Free World Military Assistance Forces, as directed by higher headquarters.
Providing medical equipment maintenance and repair facilities.
Supervising the medical equipment status reporting system.
Providing guidance on the establishment of security of personnel, equipment, facilities and billets of elements of assigned and attached units.
Providing medical support to Free World Military Assistance Forces, prisoners of war and to civilian war casualties, as directed by higher headquarters.
Providing medical support to civilian contract agencies in accordance with contractual agreements.
Inspecting personnel, material and training of subordinate units to evaluate unit readiness.
Conducting civic action programs in accordance with established policies.
Providing chaplain activities within the command, supervising and providing staff direction to chaplains and chaplain activities of all elements of the commend and providing morale and welfare support.
Conducting public information and command information programs for all assigned and attached medical units in accordance with established policies of higher headquarters.
Recommending and supervising the execution of measures for prevention and control of disease within the command and providing primary preventive medicine services for those organizations lacking organic medical support.
Providing preventive medicine services beyond the capability of surgeons of subordinate USARV units or commands.
Providing preventive medicine services to other United States Forces, Free World Military Assistance Forces and Government of Vietnam Armed Forces, as directed by higher headquarters.
Assisting in controlling or preventing epidemic disease in local civil populations as necessary to protect the health of USARV personnel as directed by higher headquarters.
Providing optometric support to United States Army personnel, other US Forces and Free World Military Assistance Forces on an area basis as required.

Shoulder Sleeve Insignia

Although several publications show the United States Army Health Services Command Shoulder Sleeve Insignia on "patch" charts as the insignia worn by the U.S. Army Medical Command, Vietnam, ample photographic and documentary evidence, including The Institute of Heraldry's declination to authorize the USAMEDCOMV a shoulder sleeve insignia of their own, shows that members of the command actually wore the shoulder sleeve insignia of the United States Army, Vietnam.

Distinctive Unit Insignia

No Distinctive unit insignia was authorized for the United States Army Medical Command, Vietnam by the United States Army Institute of Heraldry.
On 16 June 1971, the USAMEDCOMV requested authorization for a shoulder sleeve insignia. Although disapproved by The Institute of Heraldry on 6 October 1971, there is evidence that a "Beer Can" version of the patch was worn on the uniform pocket of some individuals.

Description
The insignia is in the shape of a shield with a "V" design in the center to represent service in Vietnam. The two four pointed stars superimposed over the "V" represents the command's derivation from the 44th Medical Brigade whose mission they assumed. The colors Red, Yellow, and Blue are symbolic of the colors of HQ, USARV.

Commanders
All commanders of the United States Army Medical Command, Vietnam were Medical Corps officers.

References

Military units and formations of the United States Army in the Vietnam War
Medical units and formations of the United States Army
Army
Military units and formations established in 1970
Military units and formations disestablished in 1972